

Parachilna is a country town in South Australia.  The town was first surveyed in 1863 due to its closeness to a government water well. It is on the railway line and road between Port Augusta and Leigh Creek. Today, the Prairie Hotel, railway station, airstrip and a few buildings remain. The road east into the Flinders Ranges leads through Parachilna Gorge, recognised for its scenic beauty, to Blinman. The town is surrounded by Motpena station pastoral lease.

The town's name is from the Aboriginal patajilnda, meaning "place of peppermint gum trees". The spelling difference is due to an early translation misreading. The railway station was completed in 1881 as part of the line to Leigh Creek through Beltana. The area was one of the set locations for the Australian feature film, Rabbit Proof Fence.

The Prairie Hotel is the only substantial building in the town, dating from the days when the rail was supreme. Away from the highway, the hotel fronts the railway line and the now derelict station building. The sandstone and limestone building has been in part retained, in part restored and extended. There are now no passengers on the line that once ran from Adelaide to Marree and connected with the old Ghan line to Oodnadatta and Alice Springs. The hotel's patrons come by car or bus. Local Aboriginal artwork decorates the lounges and dining room and there are displays of the nearby Ediacaran fossils.
 
The hotel serves feral animals like camel, goat and pig, as well as kangaroo and emu.

The historic Parachilna Fettlers' Cottages Ruins are listed on the South Australian Heritage Register.

Parachilna is located within the federal Division of Grey, the state electoral districts of Giles and Stuart, the Pastoral Unincorporated Area of South Australia and the state's Far North region. In the absence of a local government authority, the community in Parachilna receives municipal services from a state government agency, the Outback Communities Authority.

The town gives its name to a 2013 album by Andy Irvine.

See also 
Edeowie glass
Adnoartina, a spirit associated with ochre deposits near Parachilna

References

Notes

Citations

External links 
 Parachilna, Walkabout Australian travel guide

Towns in South Australia
Flinders Ranges
Far North (South Australia)
Places in the unincorporated areas of South Australia